John Hall Barron (15 April 1873 – 5 January 1951) was a British philatelist and president of the Royal Philatelic Society London 1940–46. Barron was a specialist in the philately of Mexico.

Selected publications in The London Philatelist
"Mexico: Its Names and Numbers", Volume XXIX, p. 112.
"The Counterfeits of the 1856 and 1861 Issues of Mexico", Volume XXXII, pp. 214, 239; Volume XXXIII, p. 41.
"The 1868-72 Issues of Mexico, overprinted exceptionally, at Mexico City", Volume XLII, p. 280.
"The Colombia Numeral Issues of 1904", Volume XXXIV, p. 211.
"The Settings of the 1908 Issue of Colombia", Volume XXXVII, p. 34.
"Colombia, Provisional Issues, 1920-23", Volume XLI, p. 85.
"The First Official Issue of Paraguay, and its Counterfeit", Volume XXXIX, p. 34.

References 

British philatelists
Presidents of the Royal Philatelic Society London
1951 deaths
1873 births
Philately of Mexico